

Subfamily Pyrrhopyginae: firetips

 Dull firetip, Pyrrhopyge araxes

Subfamily Pyrginae: spread-wing skippers

 Beautiful beamer, Phocides belus
 Mercurial skipper, Proteides mercurius
 Mangrove skipper, Phocides pigmalion
 Guava skipper, Phocides polybius
 Teal beamer, Phocides urania
 Silver-spotted skipper, Epargyreus clarus
 Broken silverdrop, Epargyreus exadeus
 Pepper-spotted silverdrop, Epargyreus socus orizaba
 Weak-frosted silverdrop, Epargyreus spinosa
 Zestos skipper, Epargyreus zestos
 Hammock skipper, Polygonus leo
 Manuel's skipper, Polygonus manueli
 White-striped longtail, Chioides catillus
 Zilpa longtail, Chioides zilpa
 Golden-spotted aguna, Aguna asander
 Emerald aguna, Aguna claxon
 Tailed aguna, Aguna metophis
 Mottled longtail, Typhedanus undulatus
 Mexican longtail, Polythrix mexicana
 Eight-spotted longtail, Polythrix octomaculata
 Short-tailed skipper, Zestusa dorus
 White-crescent longtail, Codatractus alcaeus
 Arizona skipper, Codatractus arizonensis
 Valeriana skipper, Codatractus mysie
 Double-striped longtail, Urbanus belli
 Dorantes longtail, Urbanus dorantes
 White-tailed longtail, Urbanus doryssus
 Esmeralda longtail, Urbanus esmeraldus
 Turquoise longtail, Urbanus evona
 Brown longtail, Urbanus procne
 Pronus longtail, Urbanus pronus
 Long-tailed skipper, Urbanus proteus
 Plain longtail, Urbanus simplicius
 Tanna longtail, Urbanus tanna
 Teleus longtail, Urbanus teleus
 Cobalt longtail, Urbanus viterboana
 Frosted flasher, Astraptes alardus
 Yellow-tipped flasher, Astraptes anaphus
 Small-spotted flasher, Astraptes egregius
 Two-barred flasher, Astraptes fulgerator
 Gilbert's flasher, Astraptes gilberti
 Golden banded-skipper, Autochton cellus
 Chisos banded skipper, Autochton cincta
 Spiky banded-skipper, Autochton neis
 Sonoran banded-skipper, Autochton pseudocellus
 Sierra Madre banded-skipper, Autochton siermadror
 Hoary edge, Achalarus lyciades
 Desert cloudywing, Achalarus casica
 Dark cloudywing, Achalarus tehuanaca
 Skinner's cloudywing, Achalarus albociliatus
 Coyote cloudywing, Achalarus toxeus
 Jalapus cloudywing, Achalarus jalapus
 Southern cloudywing, Thorybes bathyllus
 Northern cloudywing, Thorybes pylades
 Western cloudywing, Thorybes diversus
 Mexican cloudywing, Thorybes mexicana
 Confused cloudywing, Thorybes confusis
 Drusius cloudywing, Thorybes drusius
 Potrillo skipper, Cabares potrillo
 Common scarlet-eye, Nascus phocus
 Fritzgaertner's flat, Celaenorrhinus fritzgaertneri
 Stallings's flat, Celaenorrhinus stallingsi
 Falcate skipper, Spathilepia
 Mimosa skipper, Cogia calchas
 Acacia skipper, Cogia hippalus
 Outis skipper, Cogia outis
 Gold-costa skipper, Cogia caicus
 Starred skipper, Arteurotia tractipennis
 Brown enops, Polyctor enops
 Purplish-black skipper, Nisoniades rubescens
 Glazed pellicia, Pellicia arina
 Morning glory pellicia, Pellicia dimidiata
 White-haired skipper, Noctuana lactifera bipuncta
 Mottled bolla, Bolla clytius
 Rounded bolla, Bolla imbras
 Obscure bolla, Bolla brennus
 Mauve bolla, Bolla eusebius
 Golden-headed scallopwing, Staphylus ceos
 Mazans scallopwing, Staphylus mazans
 Hayhurst's scallopwing, Staphylus hayhurstii
 Aztec scallopwing, Staphylus azteca
 Variegated skipper, Gorgythion begga
 Blue-studded skipper, Sostrata bifasciata
 Dingy mylon, Mylon pelopidas
 Hoary skipper, Carrhenes canescens
 Black-spotted hoary-skipper, Carrhenes fuscescens
 Northern clipper, Milanion clito
 Glassy-winged skipper, Xenophanes tryxus
 Dusted spurwing, Antigonus erosus
 White spurwing, Antigonus emorsus
 Red-studded skipper, Noctuana stator
 Texas powdered-skipper, Systasea pulverulenta
 Arizona powdered-skipper, Systasea zampa
 Sickle-winged skipper, Achylodes thraso
 Pale sicklewing, Achlyodes pallida
 Hermit skipper, Grais stigmatica
 Brown-banded skipper, Timochares ruptifasciatus
 Common bluevent, Anastrus sempiternus
 Common bentwing, Ebrietas anacreon
 White-patched skipper, Chiomara asychis
 False duskywing, Gesta gesta
 Afranius duskywing, Erynnis afranius
 Wild indigo duskywing, Erynnis baptisiae
 Sleepy duskywing, Erynnis brizo
 Florida duskywing, Erynnis brunneus
 Funereal duskywing, Erynnis funeralis
 Horace's duskywing, Erynnis horatius
 Dreamy duskywing, Erynnis icelus
 Juvenal's duskywing, Erynnis juvenalis
 Arizona Juvenal's duskywing, Erynnis juvenalis clitus
 Columbine duskywing, Erynnis lucilius
 Mottled duskywing, Erynnis martialis
 Meridian duskywing, Erynnis meridianus
 Pacuvius duskywing, Erynnis pacuvius
 Persius duskywing, Erynnis persius
 Propertius duskywing, Erynnis propertius
 Scudder's duskywing, Erynnis scudderi
 Rocky Mountain duskywing, Erynnis telemachus
 Mournful duskywing, Erynnis tristis
 Zarucco duskywing, Erynnis zarucco
 White checkered-skipper, Pyrgus albescens
 Grizzled skipper, Pyrgus centaureae
 Appalachian grizzled skipper, Pyrgus centaureae wyandot
 Common checkered-skipper, Pyrgus communis
 Tropical checkered-skipper, Pyrgus oileus
 Desert checkered-skipper, Pyrgus philetas
 Two-banded checkered-skipper, Pyrgus ruralis
 Small checkered-skipper, Pyrgus scriptura
 Mountain checkered-skipper, Pyrgus xanthus
 Erichson's white-skipper, Heliopetes domicella
 Northern white-skipper, Heliopetes ericetorum
 Laviana white-skipper, Heliopetes laviana
 Turk's-cap white-skipper, Heliopetes macaira
 East-Mexican white-skipper, Heliopetes sublinea
 Veined white-skipper, Heliopetes arsalte
 Common streaky-skipper, Celotes nessus
 Scarce streaky-skipper, Celotes limpia
 Common sootywing, Pholisora catullus
 Mexican sootywing, Pholisora mejicana
 Mojave sootywing, Hesperopsis libya
 Saltbush sootywing, Hesperopsis alpheus
 Saltbush saltbush sootywing, Hesperopsis alpheus alpheus
 McNeill's saltbush sootywing, Hesperopsis alpheus gracielae

Subfamily Heteropterinae: skipperlings

 Arctic skipper, Carterocephalus palaemon
 Russet skipperling, Piruna pirus
 Four-spotted skipperling, Piruna polingi
 Many-spotted skipperling, Piruna cingo
 Small-spotted skipperling, Piruna microstictus
 Chisos skipperling, Piruna haferniki
 Two-rayed skipperling, Piruna roeveri

Subfamily Hesperiinae: grass skippers

 Banana skipper, Erionota thrax
 Malicious skipper, Synapte malitiosa
 Salenus skipper, Synapte salenus
 Faceted skipper, Synapte syraces
 Redundant skipper, Corticea corticea
 Pale-rayed skipper, Vidius perigenes
 Violet-patched skipper, Monca tyrtaeus
 Swarthy skipper, Nastra lherminier
 Julia's skipper, Nastra julia
 Neamathla skipper, Nastra neamathla
 Three-spotted skipper, Cymaenes tripunctus
 Fawn-spotted skipper, Cymaenes odilia
 Inca brown-skipper, Vehilius inca
 Pasture brown-skipper, Vehilius stictomenes
 Whitened remella, Remella remus
 Clouded skipper, Lerema accius
 Liris skipper, Lerema liris
 Fantastic skipper, Vettius fantasos
 Green-backed ruby-eye, Perichares philetes
 Osca skipper, Rhinthon osca
 Double-dotted skipper, Decinea percosius
 Hidden-ray skipper, Conga chydaea
 Least skipper, Ancyloxypha numitor
 Tropical least skipper, Ancyloxypha arene
 Poweshiek skipperling, Oarisma poweshiek
 Garita skipperling, Oarisma garita
 Edwards' skipperling, Oarisma edwardsii
 Orange skipperling, Copaeodes aurantiacus
 Southern skipperling, Copaeodes minimus
 Sunrise skipper, Adopaeoides prittwitzi
 European skipper, Thymelicus lineola
 Fiery skipper, Hylephila phyleus
 Alkali skipper, Pseudocopaeodes eunus
 Morrison's skipper, Stinga morrisoni
 Uncas skipper, Hesperia uncas
 Juba skipper, Hesperia juba
 Common branded skipper, Hesperia comma
 Hesperia comma colorado
 Hesperia comma assiniboia
 Apache skipper, Hesperia woodgatei
 Ottoe skipper, Hesperia ottoe
 Leonard's skipper, Hesperia leonardus
 Pahaska skipper, Hesperia pahaska
 Columbian skipper, Hesperia columbia
 Cobweb skipper, Hesperia metea
 Green skipper, Hesperia viridis
 Dotted skipper, Hesperia attalus
 Meske's skipper, Hesperia meskei
 Dakota skipper, Hesperia dacotae
 Lindsey's skipper, Hesperia lindseyi
 Indian skipper, Hesperia sassacus
 Sierra skipper, Hesperia miriamae
 Nevada skipper, Hesperia nevada
 Rhesus skipper, Polites rhesus
 Carus skipper, Polites carus
 Peck's skipper, Polites peckius
 Sandhill skipper, Polites sabuleti
 Mardon skipper, Polites mardon
 Draco skipper, Polites draco
 Baracoa skipper, Polites baracoa
 Tawny-edged skipper, Polites themistocles
 Crossline skipper, Polites origenes
 Long dash, Polites mystic
 Sonoran skipper, Polites sonora
 Whirlabout, Polites vibex
 Southern broken-dash, Wallengrenia otho
 Northern broken-dash, Wallengrenia egeremet
 Common glassywing, Pompeius pompeius
 Little glassywing, Pompeius verna
 Sachem, Atalopedes campestris
 Arogos skipper, Atrytone arogos
 Delaware skipper, Anatrytone logan
 Glowing skipper, Anatrytone mazai
 Byssus skipper, Problema byssus
 Rare skipper, Problema bulenta
 Woodland skipper, Ochlodes sylvanoides
 Rural skipper, Ochlodes agricola
 Yuma skipper, Ochlodes yuma
 Snow's skipper, Paratrytone snowi
 Spiked poan, Paratrytone rhexenor
 Mulberry wing, Poanes massasoit
 Hobomok skipper, Poanes hobomok
 Zabulon skipper, Poanes zabulon
 Taxiles skipper, Poanes taxiles
 Aaron's skipper, Poanes aaroni
 Yehl skipper, Poanes yehl
 Broad-winged skipper, Poanes viator
 Umber skipper, Poanes melane
 Common mellana, Quasimellana eulogius
 Palmetto skipper, Euphyes arpa
 Palatka skipper, Euphyes pilatka
 Dion skipper, Euphyes dion
 Bay skipper, Euphyes bayensis
 Dukes' skipper, Euphyes dukesi
 Black dash, Euphyes conspicua
 Berry's skipper, Euphyes berryi
 Two-spotted skipper, Euphyes bimacula
 Dun skipper, Euphyes vestris
 Monk skipper, Asbolis capucinus
 Dusted skipper, Atrytonopsis hianna
 Atrytonopsis hianna loammi
 Deva skipper, Atrytonopsis deva
 Moon-marked skipper, Atrytonopsis lunus
 Viereck's skipper, Atrytonopsis vierecki
 White-barred skipper, Atrytonopsis pittacus
 Python skipper, Atrytonopsis python
 Cestus skipper, Atrytonopsis cestus
 Sheep skipper, Atrytonopsis edwardsii
 Simius roadside-skipper, Amblyscirtes simius
 Large roadside-skipper, Amblyscirtes exoteria
 Cassus roadside-skipper, Amblyscirtes cassus
 Bronze roadside-skipper, Amblyscirtes aenus
 Linda's roadside-skipper, Amblyscirtes linda
 Oslar's roadside-skipper, Amblyscirtes oslari
 Pepper and salt skipper, Amblyscirtes hegon
 Elissa roadside-skipper, Amblyscirtes elissa
 Texas roadside-skipper, Amblyscirtes texanae
 Toltec roadside-skipper, Amblyscirtes tolteca
 Prenda Toltec roadside-skipper, Amblyscirtes tolteca prenda
 Lace-winged roadside-skipper, Amblyscirtes aesculapius
 Carolina roadside-skipper, Amblyscirtes carolina
 Reversed roadside-skipper, Amblyscirtes reversa
 Slaty roadside-skipper, Amblyscirtes nereus
 Nysa roadside-skipper, Amblyscirtes nysa
 Dotted roadside-skipper, Amblyscirtes eos
 Common roadside-skipper, Amblyscirtes vialis
 Celia's roadside-skipper, Amblyscirtes celia
 Bell's roadside-skipper, Amblyscirtes belli
 Dusky roadside-skipper, Amblyscirtes alternata
 Orange-headed roadside-skipper, Amblyscirtes phylace
 Orange-edged roadside-skipper, Amblyscirtes fimbriata
 Eufala skipper, Lerodea eufala
 Violet-clouded skipper, Lerodea arabus
 Olive-clouded skipper, Lerodea dysaules
 Twin-spot skipper, Oligoria maculata
 Brazilian skipper, Calpodes ethlius
 Salt marsh skipper, Panoquina panoquin
 Obscure skipper, Panoquina panoquinoides
 Wandering skipper, Panoquina errans
 Ocola skipper, Panoquina ocola
 Hecebolus skipper, Panoquina hecebola
 Purple-washed skipper, Panoquina sylvicola
 Evans' skipper, Panoquina fusina
 Violet-banded skipper, Nyctelius nyctelius
 Common therra, Vacerra bonifilius aeas
 Chestnut-marked skipper, Thespieus macareus

Subfamily Megathyminae: giant-skippers

 Orange giant-skipper, Agathymus neumoegeni (includes chisosensis)
 Arizona giant-skipper, Agathymus aryxna
 Agathymus aryxna baueri
 Agathymus aryxna gentryi
 Huachuca giant-skipper, Agathymus evansi
 Mary's giant-skipper, Agathymus mariae
 California giant-skipper, Agathymus stephensi
 Coahuila giant-skipper, Agathymus remingtoni
 Poling's giant-skipper, Agathymus polingi
 Mojave giant-skipper, Agathymus alliae
 Yucca giant-skipper, Megathymus yuccae (includes coloradensis)
 Cofaqui giant-skipper, Megathymus cofaqui (includes harrisi)
 Strecker's giant-skipper, Megathymus streckeri
 Ursine giant-skipper, Megathymus ursus
 Manfreda giant-skipper, Stallingsia maculosa

References
Jim P. Brock, Kenn Kaufman (2003). Butterflies of North America. Boston: Houghton Mifflin. .

North America
Hesperiidae